The Steiner Academy Hereford is a Steiner-Waldorf Academy school in Much Dewchurch near Hereford, Herefordshire, UK. It opened in September 2008 based at the earlier Hereford Waldorf School and is the first publicly funded Steiner-Waldorf school in the UK. The school takes students from the Kindergarten age of 3 to 16.

Natural Environment Academy
As a state funded Academy its specialism is the natural environment. The Academy is based on the earlier Hereford Waldorf School which existed for 25 years at the same site and comprised a Victorian school, medieval farmhouse and a more recent Kindergarten extension, and 18th century barns. Between 2008 and 2011 the school and site were redeveloped by John Renshaw Architects in a £6.5 million project that transformed the school using natural materials. This redevelopment provided a new hall, renewable energy, and buildings upgraded to reduce the environmental footprint, while organising the development of the site in sympathy with the natural environment. The school has outdoor classrooms and a significant area of productive gardens and other ecology areas dedicated to Landwork activities.

Controversies
In December 2009 Steiner Academy Hereford was bottom of the primary school league tables for England derived from SATS scores at Key Stage 2. Parents had opposed the testing and many children were absent for the dates.

In contrast with assessment tests, in July 2013 Ofsted reported  that 'Pupils are well prepared for more formal learning', 'Pupils achieve well throughout the school, reaching above the expected levels', they 'Go on to successfully study and achieve wide-ranging qualifications at GCE A level and beyond.', 'Older students develop strong independent working and thinking skills', 'Pupils’ artistic and practical achievements are impressive', 'Pupils have a strong sense of personal responsibility', and 'bullying is extremely rare'.

In September 2012, the school was accused by the British Humanist Association of including pseudoscience in its curriculum. Clarence Harvey, an acting principal of the Steiner Academy Hereford, responded: 'It is not our aim to promote scientific orthodoxy, but rather to enable pupils to think and engage in independent verification of reality.'

See also
Curriculum of the Waldorf schools

Notes and references

External links
Official site
UK Steiner Fellowship
Guardian Education article on SAH 25 May 2012
John Renshaw Architects redevelopment of SAC 2008-2011
Steiner Academy Frome
European Council for Steiner Waldorf Education

Waldorf schools in the United Kingdom
Academies in Herefordshire
Educational institutions established in 2008
2008 establishments in England
Secondary schools in Herefordshire
Primary schools in Herefordshire